Thornhill is a federal electoral district in Ontario, Canada, that has been represented in the House of Commons of Canada since 1997. It covers its namesake Thornhill neighbourhood, which is split between the Cities of Vaughan and Markham. The Vaughan portion also includes parts of the city east of Highway 400 and south of Rutherford Road, including the largely industrial district of Concord and Vaughan's planned downtown; Vaughan Metropolitan Centre. The part in the City of Markham is restricted its portion of Thornhill itself (but does not include it all) west of Bayview Avenue. The riding was created in 1996 and the east end of the riding was split off into other ridings in 2012. 

The riding was initially safe for the Liberals, and they won large majorities of the vote in its first two elections. In 2004, the large Jewish population started shifting toward the Conservative Party, and the Conservatives won the riding in 2008. After being targeted by the Conservatives as part of their strategy to win a majority in 2011, the riding became a Conservative stronghold.

Riding profile
The riding is named after Thornhill, a suburban neighbourhood founded as a rural community that was first settled along Yonge Street in the mid-1790s, around the time of the street's opening. The district of Concord and Vaughan Metropolitan Centre occupies the northern and western parts of the riding.

According to the 2016 census, the population of the riding was 112,719, up 2.1% from 2011. In 2015, the median income in the riding was $33,474 compared to $30,798 in 2010. The average income in the riding was $54,590 compared to $47,097 in 2010. The most spoken non-official language in the riding is Russian (14.5%) and 16.4% of the population is of Russian Ethnic origin. The second largest ethnic origin is Chinese with 11.2% in 2016. About 37% of the riding's population is part of a visible minority. The riding also has a large Jewish population (37.1% in 2011) and has been cited as showing voting trends among Jewish populations. The riding has a higher rate of postsecondary certificates, diplomas, and degrees than the Ontario average (66% compared to 55% for those aged 15+). The riding has been described as a Conservative stronghold.

Demographics

According to the Canada 2021 Census

Ethnic groups: 57% White, 11.3% Chinese, 7% West Asian, 6.3% South Asian, 5.1% Korean, 4.8% Filipino, 2.6% Black, 1.5% Latin American, 1.1% Southeast Asian

History

1996-2004: Liberal dominance
The riding was first established in the 1996 redistribution from parts of York North and Markham—Whitchurch—Stouffville, consisting of the part of Vaughan east of Highway 400 and south of Rutherford Road, and the part of Markham west of Highway 404. Both of the ridings Thornhill was originally part of elected Liberal MPs in 1993, though York North's Liberal vote share was about 17% more of the vote than that of Markham—Whitchurch—Stouffville. The riding's redistributed result had the Liberals at 60%, triple the amount of the Progressive Conservatives (PCs).  In the 1997 election, Liberal candidate Elinor Caplan, who had previously served in the cabinet of former Premier David Peterson, won with 59% of the vote, more than double the number received by PC candidate Bill Fisch, who came second. Similarly to the previous election, the Liberals had nearly swept the province of Ontario, this time winning all but two seats.

In 1999, Caplan was appointed to Prime Minister Jean Chrétien's cabinet as Minister of Citizenship and Immigration. In the 2000 election, Caplan would win again, this time with nearly 65% of the vote and by more than four times the amount won by Canadian Alliance candidate Robert Goldin. Provincially, the Liberals had won another near-sweep of Ontario. In 2002, Chrétien moved Caplan to Minister of National Revenue. During the 2003 electoral redistribution, the boundaries of the district did not change.

2004-2011: Shift to the Conservatives

On February 23, 2004, Caplan announced that she would not run in the next federal election. The Liberals then chose Susan Kadis, who was then a Vaughan City Councillor, as their candidate for the next election. In the 2004 election, many ridings with large Jewish populations, Thornhill among them, started shifting toward the Conservative Party. The Liberal Party would end up losing 10% of the vote and they were now at 54.6%, about 20% more of the vote than Conservative candidate Josh Cooper. In the 2006 election, both Kadis and the Conservative candidate got slightly less votes than in 2004.

Shortly after the 2006 election, Kadis was chosen to be the associate critic for Infrastructure and Communities. In March 2008, she was appointed National Revenue critic by Opposition Leader Stéphane Dion. In the 2008 election, the Conservative Party chose Peter Kent, an established media personality who had run in Toronto-St. Paul's in 2006, as their candidate. Kent would end up winning the riding with 49% of the vote compared to Kadis' 39%, possibly due to the fact that Conservative Prime Minister Stephen Harper promised continued support for Israel.

2011-present: Conservative stronghold
Kent served as the Minister of State of Foreign Affairs for the Americas until a January 2011 cabinet shuffle when he was promoted to Minister of the Environment. This was met with some criticism as he was the fifth Environment Minister in five years. It also signalled Prime Minister Harper's determination to increase support in the Greater Toronto Area. In the 2011 election, the Conservative Party targeted the riding as part of their strategy to gain a majority government and both Prime Minister Harper and Liberal leader Michael Ignatieff had campaign stops in the riding. Kent ended up increasing his vote share to 61%, compared to 24% for the Liberal candidate.

During the 2012 redistribution, the area of the riding east of Bayview Avenue was divided along Highway 407, with portions being transferred to Richmond Hill and the new riding of Markham—Thornhill. Concerns were raised about dividing the Thornhill neighbourhood into two ridings, suggesting that Concord (which includes Vaughan Metropolitan Centre) be excluded from the riding instead. The name of the riding was also an issue, as the proposed name, "Vaughan—Thornhill" was thought to exclude the Markham portion. Markham was initially added to the name before Kent suggested reverting it back to "Thornhill". His suggestion was accepted by the commission. The redistributed result put the Conservatives 2% higher than the actual result. In July 2013, Kent was shuffled out of cabinet, becoming a backbench MP. During his tenure, critics had described him as "Canada's worst environment minister."

In the 2015 election, Kent lost about 5% of the vote, now receiving 58.6% to the Liberal candidate's 33.7%. Shortly after the 2015 election, Kent became the Conservative Foreign Affairs critic. After a 2017 shadow cabinet shuffle, Kent became the Conservatives' Ethics critic. In 2019, Kent won his fourth consecutive election with 54.6% of the vote to Liberal candidate Gary Gladstone's 35.4%. After the 2019 election, Kent was appointed critic on immigration, refugees, and citizenship. In 2021, Kent announced he would not run in the next election.

Following this, Melissa Lantsman won the nomination to represent the Conservative Party in Thornhill. On September 20th 2021, Melissa Lantsman won the riding of Thornhill by a 15-point margin.

Members of Parliament

This riding has elected the following members of the House of Commons of Canada:

Election results

	

Note: Conservative vote is compared to the total of the Canadian Alliance vote and Progressive Conservative vote in 2000 election.

Note: Canadian Alliance vote is compared to the Reform vote in 1997 election.

See also
 List of Canadian federal electoral districts
 Past Canadian electoral districts

References

Sources
Riding history from the Library of Parliament
 2011 results from Elections Canada
 [www.elections.ca Campaign expense data from Elections Canada]

Ontario federal electoral districts
Politics of Markham, Ontario
Politics of Vaughan
1996 establishments in Ontario